Seewen is a village in the municipality of Schwyz, itself in the canton of Schwyz in Switzerland. The outfall stream of the lake, the Seeweren, passes through the village on its way to join the Muota river.

Schwyz railway station, on the Gotthard railway, is located in Seewen. The A4 motorway passes just to the west of the village, and an adjacent motorway junction provides access to it.

References

External links
 

Geography of the canton of Schwyz
Villages in Switzerland
Schwyz